Saint Olav Drama is an outdoor theatre performance played every end of July in Stiklestad in Verdal, Norway.

The play commemorates the Battle of Stiklestad that took place in the year 1030, and which resulted in death of King Olaf II of Norway. In the aftermath of his death, King Olaf would later be canonized as Saint Olaf (Heilag Olav), patron saint of Norway. The play explores the transition process between traditional pagan customs and the introduction of Christianity into Norway.

The play draws on historic events mentioned in Heimskringla written by Snorri Sturlson. The play features other historical Norwegian figures, including Rögnvald Brusason and Thorir Hund.

Saint Olav Drama was written by Olav Gullvåg, with music composed by Paul Okkenhaug (1908-1975). It has been staged every year since 1954. Among featured directors have been Norwegian stage producer Stein Winge.

See also
Olsok
Óláfs saga helga
Oldest Saga of St. Olaf
Legendary Saga of St. Olaf
Separate Saga of St. Olaf

References

Other sources
Berezin, Henrik Adventure Guide Scandinavia (Hunter Publishing, 2012)  
March, Linda Norway - Culture Smart!: the essential guide to customs & culture    ( Kuperard. 2006) 
Myklebus, Morten. Olaf Viking & Saint (Norwegian Council for Cultural Affairs, 1997) 
O'Leary, Margaret Hayford   Culture and Customs of Norway (Greenwood. 2010) 

In Norwegian
Andersen, Per Sveaa  Samlingen av Norge og kristningen av landet : 800–1130  (Universitetsforlaget; 1977) 
Ekrem, Inger; Lars Boje Mortensen; Karen Skovgaard-Petersen Olavslegenden og den Latinske Historieskrivning i 1100-tallets Norge (Tusculanum Press; 2000) 
 Hoftun, Oddgeir Kristningsprosessens og herskermaktens ikonografi i nordisk middelalder (Borgen forlag. Oslo; 2008) 
Hoftun, Oddgeir Stavkirkene – og det norske middelaldersamfunnet (Borgen forlag. København; 2002)

External links
NRK Trøndelag  
Jubel på Stiklestad
Stiklestad
Spelet om Heilag Olav
Saint Olav Festival
Spelet om Heilag Olav 2015 

Culture in Trøndelag
Stiklestad
1954 plays
Norwegian plays
Plays set in Norway
Plays set in the 11th century